...For Victory is the fifth album by British death metal band Bolt Thrower. It was recorded at Sawmill studios in 1994, produced by Colin Richardson and Bolt Thrower. A limited edition contains a live CD titled Live War.

The song "...For Victory" contains a quote from Laurence Binyon poem, known as the Ode of Remembrance.

This would be the last release with Andrew Whale on drums.

Track listing
All songs written by Bolt Thrower

Personnel
Bolt Thrower
 Karl Willetts – Vocals
 Gavin Ward – Guitars
 Barry Thomson – Guitars
 Andrew Whale – drums
 Jo Bench – Bass guitar

Production
 John Cornfield - Engineering
 Colin Richardson - Producer

References

1994 albums
Bolt Thrower albums
Earache Records albums
Albums produced by Colin Richardson